Bhavan's Adarsha Vidyalaya, one of the six schools of the Bharatiya Vidya Bhavan, Kochi Kendra is a senior secondary school affiliated to the Central Board of Secondary Education. The school is situated at Kakkanad, Kochi, India.

History 
The school was founded by R. Vasudevan Pillai and Santhi Balagopalan, and was inaugurated on 2 July 1989 by His Highness Marthanda Varma Illaya Raja of Travancore. Upon inception, the school only had classes up to 3rd Grade, but now has classes from Kindergarten to Grade XII with a student strength of over 2000. The school is now one of the best schools in Kerala excelling in various cultural events, quizzes, sports events and many more.

Present 
The school is headed by principal, Shri.Suresh K  and vice principal, Smt. Jyothi.
The school is part of Bharatiya Vidya Bhavan which has six other schools in Kochi, which include: Bhavan's Vidya Mandir (Girinagar), Bhavans Vidya Mandir (Elamakkara), Bhavan's Vidya Mandir (Eroor), Bhavan's Varuna Vidyalaya, Bhavan's Munshi Vidyashram and Bhavan's Newsprint Vidyalaya.

The school's current student council for 2020-21 includes: 

Adithya S Prabhu- Senior Head Boy 
Sailakshmi Menon - Senior Head Girl

Aneeta Ginu- Senior Sport

nirajnan p suresh - Junior Head Boy 

Aaliya Akhbar- Junior Head Girl 

Philip Joby  - Junior Sports Captain 

The school has over 2000 students from classes 1 to 12 who are being educated by a staff of over 100.

House activity 

There are eight houses into which the students from all classes are divided. These houses are named after moral values from ancient Indian Texts.
 Ahimsa (Non-Violence)
 Dharma (Justice)
 Jnanam (Knowledge)
 Satyam (Truth)
 Sevanam (Service)
 Shanthi (Peace)
 Thyagam (Sacrifice)
 Vinayam (Humility)

Clubs & Other activities 
The school is well known in and around the city for the various activities it conducts. The school also has eight clubs, which hold various intra-school activities throughout the year. The clubs are as follows 
 Science Club
 Integrity Club - Established with the help of Bharat Petroleum.
 Social Service Club
 Quiz Club
 Maths Club
 Reading Club
 Interact Club
 Health and Wellness Club

Activities and contributions to students 

The school hosts an annual Inter- school Football Tournament called 'Adarsha Cup' during the months of August and September. Schools in and around Kochi take part in this tournament.
Bhavans also organises the Bhavans fest(cultural event) around November which gives a platform to many talented children .
From 2015, the school has started hosting Labyrinth-Bitwiz, a cultural and technology fest for the schools in Kochi. This was also held in the year 2016.

Even though the events were a grand success, and showed extensive participation, due to the management's decision, the Labyrinth-Bitwiz fest was suspended after two years since its inception. This was replaced with Sahitheeyam, a literary fest held on a much smaller scale, and a narrower field of competitions.

School magazine 

The School publishes an annual magazine entitled 'Darpan'. This Magazine is given to every student and contains the achievements of the school in the year, and also acts as a medium for young writers and poets to publish their stories and poems in Malayalam, Sanskrit, English and Hindi.

See also
 List of schools in Ernakulam
 Bharatiya Vidya Bhavan
 Bhavan's Vidya Mandir, Girinagar
 Bhavans Varuna Vidhyalaya

References

Schools affiliated with the Bharatiya Vidya Bhavan
Private schools in Kochi
1989 establishments in Kerala